Jan Platil (born February 9, 1983 in Kladno, Czechoslovakia) is a professional ice hockey player, who is currently contracted with Hull Pirates.

Career

Draft
He was drafted in the seventh round, 218 th overall, by the Ottawa Senators in the 2001 NHL Entry Draft.

Club career
The defenceman has played for the HC Kladno, Barrie Colts, Binghamton Senators and Lukko. He has also played for HC CSKA Moscow and Amur Khabarovsk in the Russian Super League, Tappara in the SM-liiga. Jan now plays in England where he is captain of the newly formed Hull Pirates who play in the English 2nd tire league EPIHL

OHL Performers of the Month

December 2002
Defenceman of the Month - Jan Platil, Barrie Colts

February 2003
Defenceman of the Month - Jan Platil, Barrie Colts

March 2003
Defenceman of the Month - Jan Platil, Barrie Colts
 
October 2003
Defenceman of the Month - Jan Platil, Barrie Colts

December 2003
Defenceman of the Month - Jan Platil, Barrie Colts

Career statistics

Regular season and playoffs

International

External links

1983 births
Barrie Colts players
Binghamton Senators players
Czech expatriate ice hockey players in Russia
Amur Khabarovsk players
HC CSKA Moscow players
Living people
Lukko players
Ottawa Senators draft picks
Sportspeople from Kladno
Traktor Chelyabinsk players
Czech ice hockey defencemen
Czech expatriate sportspeople in England
Expatriate ice hockey players in England
Czech expatriate ice hockey players in Canada
Czech expatriate ice hockey players in the United States
Czech expatriate ice hockey players in Finland
Czech expatriate ice hockey players in Germany
Czech expatriate ice hockey players in Slovakia
Expatriate ice hockey players in Italy
Czech expatriate sportspeople in Italy